Tango Lee McCauley (born October 27, 1978) is a former gridiron football offensive lineman. He played college football at Alabama State.

In his career, McCauley has played for the Saskatchewan Roughriders, British Columbia Lions, Dallas Cowboys, Carolina Panthers, Chicago Rush, Montreal Alouettes, New Orleans VooDoo, Austin Wranglers, and Cleveland Gladiators.

High school years
McCauley attended John Marshall High School in Oklahoma City, and was a letterman in football, basketball, and track & field. In football, he was an All-State selection. He graduated in 1997.

College career
McCauley spent three seasons playing at Texas A&M (1998–2000) before transferring to Alabama State University in 2001. He was a two-year starter at left tackle for Texas A&M, earning preseason All-Big 12 honors before the 2000 season. He earned Division I-AA All-America honors at Alabama State as an Offensive Tackle in 2001.

Professional career

Pre-draft
McCauley was invited, and attended the 2002 NFL Combine. He was rated the 28th best guard out of 43, and was projected to go unselected in the draft.

Canadian Football League (2003 - 2005, 2007)
McCauley went as projected and was not selected in the 2002 NFL Draft and was out of football in 2002. He then signed with the Saskatchewan Roughriders of the Canadian Football League. Then, in 2004 played for the British Columbia Lions, where he won the Grey Cup. That same year, he attended training camp with the Dallas Cowboys, as well as the Carolina Panthers, he however failed to make the final roster of either team. He returned to the Roughriders in 2005.

Arena Football League (2006 - 2008)
In 2006, McCauley signed with the Chicago Rush of the Arena Football League. He played in 14 games as a rookie, primarily on the offensive line at Guard and Center. He did however play some on defense, where he recorded 2.5 tackles and one pass broken up.

McCauley then returned to the CFL after the 2006 AFL season, signing in July 2006 with the Montreal Alouettes. Then in 2007, he signed with the New Orleans VooDoo where he played in seven games mostly on the offensive line, however, he also recorded six receptions for 34 yards and three touchdowns, as well as two tackles. He was then waived by the VooDoo and signed by the Austin Wranglers of the af2, where he played in eight games. After the season, he signed with the Cleveland Gladiators. After the 2008 season, on September 30, he was released by the Gladiators.

Personal
McCauley's uncle Dennis Kimbro is an established writer and his cousin, Marcus Nash, plays for the Dallas Desperados.  McCauley lives in Oklahoma City during the off-season. He
enjoys outdoor sports, especially hunting and fishing.

Notes

External links
 Dallas Cowboys bio

1978 births
Living people
Sportspeople from Oklahoma City
American football offensive linemen
Texas A&M Aggies football players
Alabama State Hornets football players
American players of Canadian football
Canadian football offensive linemen
Saskatchewan Roughriders players
BC Lions players
Montreal Alouettes players
Chicago Rush players
Austin Wranglers players
New Orleans VooDoo players
Cleveland Gladiators players
Players of American football from Oklahoma